YPO (formerly Young Presidents' Organization) is an American-based worldwide leadership community of chief executives with approximately 29,000 members in more than 130 countries, according to the organization's 2019 YPO international fact sheet.

History 
YPO was founded in 1950 in Rochester, New York, by manufacturer Ray Hickok, who was 27 years old when he became the head of his family's Rochester-based Hickok Belt, a 300-employee company.

The first meeting was held in 1950 at the Waldorf Astoria New York and was attended by Robert Wood Johnson III (Johnson & Johnson). Hickok and a small group of young presidents in the area began meeting regularly to share and learn from each other. According to the organization, its founding principle is that of education and idea exchange among peers.
 The first non-U.S. chapter was created in 1956 in Ontario, Canada.
 The first YPO University was held in Miami Beach, Florida.
 YPO merged with its graduate organization, World Presidents Organization (WPO), in 2007.
 The YPO Global Pulse survey launched in 2009, and is a quarterly economic confidence index that shares business insights from CEOs.
 In 2010, Jill Belconis became the first woman elected to serve as YPO-WPO international chairman.
 YPO formed an editorial partnership with CNBC in 2012.
Elizabeth Zucker is the 2019-2020 chairman of the YPO Board of Directors.

Demographics 
As of 2019, there are more than 450 chapters worldwide and more than 28,000 members.

Membership requirements 
To qualify for membership, a person must have become, before age 45, the president or chairman and chief executive officer of a corporation of significance with a minimum revenue and minimum number of employees. The financial criteria differ for service companies and banks. Candidates must be typically recommended by two members of a local chapter and approved by a membership committee of each local chapter.

Notable members
 Mukesh Ambani, chairman and managing director of Reliance Industries and 8th richest person in the world with >$100bn
 Charles R. Schwab, Founder & CEO, Charles Schwab Corporation
 Peter Ueberroth, Chairman, 1984 L.A. Olympic Games, former Commissioner, Major League Baseball
 Bob Galvin, Founder & former CEO, Motorola
 Jim Balsille, Co-Founder & former Co-CEO, Research in Motion/Blackberry
 Douglas Fairbanks Jr., founder of  United Artists motion picture studio
 Christie Hefner, former CEO, Playboy Enterprises
 Ray Lee Hunt, Hunt Oil
 Brad Fuller, Founder and CEO, Lightspeed Voice
 Robert Wood Johnson II, president of Johnson & Johnson
 James Michael Lafferty, CEO Fine Hygienic Holding and former CEO within Procter and Gamble, Coca Cola and British American Tobacco
 Leonard Lauder, former CEO, Estee Lauder
 Bernard Le Grelle, Founder and former CEO of Interel (merged in 2022 with Dentons)
 Heidi Zak, Founder and CEO, Third Love
 Penny Pritzker, US Secretary of Commerce
 Muna AbuSulayman, Saudi businesswoman, activist and television personality
 Jim Pattison, a Canadian business magnate, investor and philanthropist
 Sheryl Sandberg, COO Facebook
 Jonathan Zucker, CEO 1-Chinaman Co. Ltd.
Mohnish Pabrai, Managing Partner Pabrai Investment Funds
Xavier Mufraggi, former CEO of Club Med EMEA and chairman of YPO since 2020

YPO EDGE 
YPO hosts its leadership gathering, YPO EDGE, each year in a different city. Previous host cities include:
 2022 | New York City
 2019 | Cape Town, South Africa
 2018 | Singapore

Publications
Pat McNees, YPO: The First 50 Years. (Orange Frazer Press, 1999).

References

External links 
 YPO Official Site

Non-profit organizations based in Texas
International non-profit organizations
Organizations established in 1950